Hamburg is an unincorporated community in Shenandoah County, Virginia, United States.

References

Unincorporated communities in Virginia
Unincorporated communities in Shenandoah County, Virginia